Wieden+Kennedy (W+K;  earlier styled Wieden & Kennedy) is an American independent global advertising agency best known for its work for Nike. Founded by Dan Wieden and David Kennedy, and headquartered in Portland, Oregon, it is one of the largest independently owned advertising agencies in the world.

History
Dan Wieden met David Kennedy in 1980, at the William Cain advertising agency while working on the Nike account. They took Nike with them as a client after founding Wieden & Kennedy (later changed to Wieden+Kennedy) on April 1, 1982, and remain the agency of record. The agency's first advertisements were three television commercials for Nike that were aired during the New York City Marathon in October 1982.

Over the years, the agency has added offices in New York City, London, Amsterdam, Shanghai, Tokyo, Delhi and in late 2010, São Paulo. W+K's turbulent relationship with former client Subaru is the basis of Randall Rothenberg's 1995 book Where the Suckers Moon: The Life and Death of an Advertising Campaign.

Media
 
Wieden+Kennedy has created original content for various brands under the moniker W+K Entertainment since 2001. Its productions include Battlegrounds, an MTV2 series showcasing streetball; Ginga, a documentary about Brazilian football (soccer) players; and Road to Paris, documenting Lance Armstrong's path to his third Tour de France victory in 2001.

In 2003, Wieden+Kennedy created W+K Tokyo Lab, a record label and creative workshop based out of the agency's Tokyo office. Since 2003, W+K Tokyo Lab has released CD/DVD titles that combine music, graphics, and film. Tokyo Lab's current roster features local hip-hop and electronic artists including Hifana, DJ Uppercut, Afra, and Takagi Masakatsu.

2004 saw the launch of "Wieden+Kennedy 12", a 13-month experimental advertising program that accepts 13 applicants each year for an intensive laboratory experience where students work for real clients under the direction of members of the W+K Portland office.

In 2006, Wieden+Kennedy debuted an afternoon showcase of established and emerging musical artists in the atrium of W+K's Portland office, dubbed the "LunchBox" concert series. Past concerts have featured Janelle Monáe, Art Brut, The Rapture, Son Volt, Lyrics Born, Ladytron, Cut Chemist, Cold War Kids, Nada Surf, Juliette and the Licks, Pete Yorn and Snax.

Wieden+Kennedy's exploration into original programming was started in late 2008 with WK Radio, and subsequently in Fall 2009 with WKEntertainment.

Awards
Two of the agency's television ads for Nike have won Emmy Awards: "The Morning After," which featured a runner on New Year's Day in 2000, not noticing that every dire Y2K prediction has come to pass; and "Move," which edited seamlessly dozens of athletes and children moving from one sport or activity to another. "The Morning After" aired in late 1999 and won the Emmy in 2000; "Move" aired during the 2002 Winter Olympics and won the Emmy that year.

In 2002, the Gunn Report named W+K as the most-awarded agency in the world, and the agency was AdWeek's "Global Agency of the Year" in 2007.

"It's Mine", Wieden+Kennedy's advertisement for Coca-Cola which aired during Super Bowl XLII in 2008, was named as the best Super Bowl commercial of the decade by Adweek magazine. The magazine also picked W+K's "Grrr" for Honda as the overall commercial of the decade. Meanwhile, Bob Garfield of AdAge added Wieden+Kennedy's "Go Forth" for Levi's as one of the worst ads in 2009.

The next year Adweek named them as agency of the year for their work, which included "The Man Your Man Could Smell Like" campaign for Old Spice.

Both Creativity and AdAge named Wieden+Kennedy agency of the year for 2010. In 2011, Fast Company named Wieden+Kennedy as one of the 50 most innovative companies.

Selected notable campaigns

Nike
 The "Just Do It." tagline, coined by Dan Wieden, and inspired by the final words of executed murderer Gary Gilmore.
 "Bo Knows", featuring professional football and baseball player Bo Jackson.
 An iconic commercial in which Brazilian footballer Ronaldinho puts on a new pair of Nike shoes and subsequently begins juggling the ball and kicking it off the crossbar of the goalpost several times, not letting it touch the ground. This commercial went viral on YouTube and was the first YouTube video to reach one million views.
 Air Jordan ads featuring Spike Lee as "Mars Blackmon".
 Charles Barkley's "'I Am Not a Role Model'" ad.
 "Revolution", featuring the Beatles song "Revolution".
 "Instant Karma", featuring the song "Instant Karma!" by John Lennon.
 The "If You Let Me Play" campaign, empowering girls to participate in character-building team sports.
 Noted Nike basketball ads starring Penny Hardaway (Li'l Penny), and LeBron James (the LeBrons).
 Lance Armstrong's "LIVESTRONG" yellow bracelet campaign to raise funds for cancer research.
 "Pretty", featuring tennis player Maria Sharapova.
 "Here I Am", 22 stories of confidence through sport, for Nike Women, Spring 2008.
 "Write the Future", for Nike Football, Summer 2010.
"Dream Crazy" for Nike's 30th anniversary of the "Just Do It" campaign, Fall 2018.

Facebook
 "Facebook Home" campaign for Facebook Home, Spring 2013.

Coca-Cola
 "The Coke Side of Life" campaign, including "Video Game", featuring a tough-guy video game character who experiences a change of heart after drinking a Coke (thematically centered upon the video game series Grand Theft Auto).
 "Yours", Diet Coke campaign, as seen during the 2007 Academy Awards.
 "AmericaIsBeautiful" campaign, seen during the 2014 Super Bowl, 2014 Winter Olympics. This was rerun during the 2017 Super Bowl as "TogetherIsBeautiful".

ESPN
 The "This is SportsCenter" campaign, a satirical look behind the scenes at ESPN headquarters
 "Your NBA Destination" campaign, marking ESPN as the destination for all things NBA.

Honda
 "Grrr", featuring the song "Hate Something, Change Something" as voiced by Garrison Keillor.
 "Cog", a Rube Goldberg-esque assembly of the separate parts of a Honda.
 "Impossible Dream", a two-minute long showcase of the variety of Honda vehicles.
 "Impossible Dream II", a re-released, extended version of the original "Impossible Dream" advert.
 "Hands", the most successful Honda advert to date.

Microsoft
 The tagline, "Where do you want to go today?", used during the company's marketing campaigns during the 1990s and early-2000s.

Miller Brewing
 "The High Life Man", directed by award-winning filmmaker Errol Morris.

Old Spice
 "Experience is Everything" campaign featuring actor Bruce Campbell.
 "The Man Your Man Could Smell Like" featuring actor Isaiah Mustafa.

Procter & Gamble
 "Thanks, Mom", featuring a version of the song "You'll Never Walk Alone", as part of their 2010 Winter Olympic campaign.

Chrysler
 "Born of Fire", a two-minute spot featuring Eminem and an excerpt of his song "Lose Yourself", aired in 2011 during Super Bowl XLV.  An ad with a similar production, featuring Clint Eastwood, titled "Halftime in America", aired during the next Super Bowl, Super Bowl XLVI. It featured the same slogan, "Imported from Detroit", and was also two minutes long.

3 Mobile
 "Pony", a UK campaign featuring a Shetland Pony moonwalking to Fleetwood Mac's "Everywhere".

Make in India
 In 2015, the company also carried out the "Make in India" Campaign led by the Indian PM Shri Narendra Modi. The campaign was regarded as a huge success and received an overwhelming global response.

Bud Light
 "Dilly Dilly" which was first featured in an ad titled "Banquet" launch in August 2017 and subsequently became a catchphrase. The campaign was well received by the public and led to a total of 16 advertisements which used the catchphrase. Super Bowl LII featured "Dilly Dilly" ads from Bud Light.

References

External links

 Official website
 Portland Business Journal article
 USA Today article
 Adweek Agency of the Year 2007

 
Advertising agencies of the United States
Companies based in Portland, Oregon
Pearl District, Portland, Oregon
Marketing companies established in 1982
1982 establishments in Oregon
Privately held companies based in Oregon